Andrzej Krzanowski (9 April 1951, in Czechowice-Dziedzice – 1 October 1990, in Czechowice-Dziedzice) was a Polish composer of classical music, accordionist, and teacher.

Between 1971–75 Krzanowski studied with Henryk Górecki at the University of Music in Katowice.

He was an author of small and big chamber music forms scored for unconventional instruments, often in combination with a human voice or tape music, most often with the participation of the accordion. He was inspired by contemporary literature and he liked to use a quotation (Johann Sebastian Bach, Karol Szymanowski, Henryk Mikołaj Górecki). He was capable of creating an unusual climate with a considerable amount of expression ranging from spontaneous (Concerto for Orchestra) to lyrical and contemplative (Second Symphony, Third String Quartet).

Selected works
 Audycja II WG Poezji (After Jacek Bieriezin); for reciter, flute, tam-tam, siren, whistle and 2 tapes, 1973
 De Profundis (cantata) for baritone and orchestra, 1974
 Symphony No. 1 for Orchestra, 1975
 Studium V (from Second Book) for Accordion Quintet, 1976
 Canti di Wratislavia for Symphony Orchestra, 1976
 Studium I for Accordion and Orchestra, 1979
 Salve Regina for Boys Choir or Female Choir, 1981
 6th Programme for Soprano and String Quartet, 1982
 Symphony No. 2 for 13 String Instruments, 1984
 Relief IX (Szkocki) / RelieftIX; for string quartet and tape (1988)

Notes

External links
 Andrzej Krzanowski at PWM Edition

1951 births
1990 deaths
Polish composers
20th-century classical composers
People from Czechowice-Dziedzice
Polish male classical composers
20th-century accordionists
20th-century male musicians